Somabrachys nisseni is a moth in the Somabrachyidae family. It was described by Powell in 1916.

References

Zygaenoidea
Moths described in 1916